Robert Henry Lindsay (April 23, 1868 – March 19, 1938) was a Canadian painter.

Personal life 
Lindsay was born at Prescott, Ontario on April 23, 1868. His father, George Lindsay, relocated his family to Brockville, Ontario while Robert was a young child. Robert Lindsay married Margaret Ellen Boucher, at Carleton Place on 30 September 1907. Robert Lindsay was an outdoors-man who liked cycling. He was interested in rowing and was made the first honorary member of the Brockville Rowing Club. Apart from his profession as an artist and a studio painter, he had as a hobby wood carving. Lindsay died at Brockville on March 19, 1938.

Artist
 
From early in his life, Lindsay was interested in art. In addition to his schooling, he attended the Brockville Mechanics' Institute. The Mechanics’ Institute included an art school that provided graphic arts education where Lindsay developed his skills. He took a position as a painter in the James Smart Manufacturing Company. While employed at Smart's he studied painting and sketching under Percy F. Woodcock, R.C.A. at the Brockville Ontario Government School of Art. This led him to a career as a professional artist and painter in oils and watercolour. In 1911 he became a part-time art instructor at the school and later succeeded Woodcock as the art instructor at the Ontario Government School of Art in Brockville, a position that he held for 12 years. He also taught drawing at the  St. Alban's Boys School. He sketched with Harold A. Pearl of Toronto, particularly in the Newboro-Westport District of Leeds County. He maintained a studio in Brockville from which he carried on a commercial art business as well as his artistic endeavours.

He was a contributing member of the  Arts Club of Montreal. He became a member at its inception in 1912. While known especially for the area of the Thousand Islands, Lindsay also traveled extensively, painting in Maine, Florida, and Ireland.

Brockville Library

Robert Lindsay, who had the benefit of the Mechanics' Institute library, became a trustee of the Brockville library. When the Carnegie Library was constructed as the permanent home of the collections he became the Vice-chair of the Brockville Public Library Board. He had drawn many pencil sketches of Brockville which are now of historical value. Following his death in 1938 his widow, Margaret Boucher Lindsay, presented about forty of his pencil sketches to the library.

Exhibitions and collections
He participated in the Montreal Art Association Spring Exhibitions from 1911 through to 1934. Lindsay exhibited both oils and watercolours with the Royal Canadian Academy of Arts, Ontario Society of Artists, and the Montreal Art Association. In addition to his regular participation in these shows in Montreal and Toronto, he is known to have had shows in Ottawa, Winnipeg, Chicago, and Belfast, Ireland. Not long after his death, Lindsay's works were shown at the Arts Club of Montreal.

His paintings were posthumously exhibited at D & E Lake Ltd., Toronto in 2006 and 2007.

Works of Robert H. Lindsay are held in the collections of the National Library and Archives of Canada and the Brockville Museum.

References

External links
 Brockville Public Library History
 Arts Club of Montreal
 Ontario Society of Artists

1868 births
1938 deaths
19th-century Canadian painters
Canadian male painters
20th-century Canadian painters
Artists from Ontario
People from Leeds and Grenville United Counties
19th-century Canadian male artists
20th-century Canadian male artists